Marquess Cheng of Zhao (?–350 BCE) was a ruler of the State of Zhao during the Warring States Period of Chinese history (475–220 BCE). Born Zhào Zhòng, he was the son of Marquess Jing of Zhao.

In 372 BCE, Marquess Cheng of Zhao built a wooden lookout tower or “tantai” at Xingdi, in modern-day Xingtai City, Hebei Province facing the other Warring States; because of the structure, the location later took on the name “Xingtai”. General Pang Juan of Wei brought troops and surrounded Handan, the capital of Zhao in 353 BCE in preparation for an attack. The State of Qi sent envoys Tian Ji and Sun Bin along with troops to assist Zhao and they later defeated the forces of Wei at the Battle of Guiling. Afterwards, in the twenty-fourth year of his reign (351 BCE), Marquess Cheng of Zhao forced King Hui of Wei into a humiliating peace treaty at the Zhang River near Handan.

References
Chen Chenyan “Dynastic History of the Warring States”, Zhonghua Publishing, China.

Monarchs of Zhao (state)
Zhou dynasty nobility
4th-century BC Chinese monarchs
Zhao (state)